98 Squadron or 98th Squadron may refer to:

 98th Southern Range Support Squadron, a unit of the Czech Air Force
 98th Fighter-Interceptor Squadron, a unit of the United States Air Force 
 No. 98 Squadron RAF, a unit of the British Royal Air Force

See also
 98th Division (disambiguation)
 98th Regiment (disambiguation)